Thomson Reservoir may refer to

 Thomson Reservoir, created by Thomson Dam in Victoria, Australia
 Thomson Reservoir, created by Thomson Dam (Minnesota), United States
 Thomson Reservoir (Oregon), United States